Melissa Cecelia Ewen Bell (5 March 1964 – 28 August 2017) was an English singer. From 1993 to 1996, Bell was one of the lead singers of British R&B act Soul II Soul, with whom she released a single titled "Wish". She also created her own band called Soul Explosion, which started in 1999. Bell also worked with Liza Minnelli, Whitney Houston and Stevie Wonder.

Early life

A native of London, Bell was of African and Indian descent through her Jamaican-born Cecil Bell and Imelda Ewen parents. She was a graduate of Southwark College in London Borough of Southwark. She later began working in customer service for Marks and Spencer from 1982 until 1991.

Career
In 1987, she was featured on Bobby E and the Midi City Crew's single "Walk on the Wild Side". In 1991, she appeared on the song "The Dancer" from the Bingoboys' album The Best of Bingoboys. She released her debut single "Reconsider" in 1992, which received major radio play. In the same year, she released another single titled "Crystal Clear".

In 1993, Bell joined British musical group Soul II Soul after Jazzie B heard her single "Reconsider" and asked her to join the group. She recorded a single called "Wish", which was released on their greatest hits album Volume IV The Classic Singles 88–93 in 1993. The single peaked at number 24 on the UK Singles Chart. Following the success of the song she was invited to perform the song, while heavily pregnant with her son, on Top of the Pops. 

She continued to record and tour with the group as one of their featured singers. In 1995, she performed lead vocals on the song "Be a Man" on their fourth studio album Volume V: Believe. In 1996, she departed from the group to continue her solo career.

In 1997, Bell released four singles "Rumbled Sex", "Surrender", "Mixed Up", and "Nothing Gonna Stop Me Now"; which featured Potential Bad Boy. In 1999, she formed a new soul band called Soul Explosion. In 2000, she released two singles "Into My World" and "Love's in Need of Love Today" with a group called Dazz. In 2002, she released another single "(No More) Searching".

In June 2010, she released her autobiography Heart and Soul: The Emotional Autobiography of Melissa Bell.

Personal life
Bell was married to David Burke (born 1954), whom she divorced in 1992 and was the mother of four children including singer Alexandra Burke. She suffered from diabetes mellitus. She also suffered kidney failure, and struggled to attend many of her daughter's live performances during her time on The X Factor. On 29 August 2017, her daughter Alexandra announced the death of the singer, her family asked for privacy.  

During the BBC1 One Show on 25 November 2020, Burke confirmed the proceeds of her 2020 Christmas record, "Silent Night" which features the voice of her mother, would all go to 'The Melisa Bell Foundation". The Foundation supports aspiring youngsters wishing to attend the "Sylvia Young Theatre School."

Discography
Singles
 1991: "Walk on the Wild Side" (Bobby E and the Midi City Crew featuring Melissa Bell)
 1992: "Reconsider"
 1992: "Crystal Clear"
 1993: "Wish" (with Soul II Soul)
 1997: "Rumbled Sex"
 1997: "Surrender"
 1997: "Mixed Up"
 1997: "Nothing Gonna Stop Me Now" (featuring Potential Bad Boy)
 2000: "Into My World" (with Dazz)
 2001: "Love's in Need of Love Today" (with Dazz)
 2002: "(No More) Searching"
 2009: "Innocent Till Proven Guilty"

References

External links
 

1964 births
2017 deaths
20th-century Black British women singers
English dance musicians
Bell, Melissa
English people of Jamaican descent
Singers from London
Place of death missing
21st-century Black British women singers
Soul II Soul members